Yahdul-Lim was a king of Carchemish proposed to have reigned between 1764 and 1745 BCE. During this period, the information about Carchemish mostly comes from the archives of Mari, Syria.

Son of Aplahanda, he succeeded his brother Yatar-Ami. Little is known about his reign.

Yatar-Ami (ca 1766-1764 BC), may have been a client of Mari. Yahdul-Lim, on the other hand, may have returned back to an alliance with Yamhad (Aleppo). This probably happened after Hammurabi conquered Mari ca 1761 BC. Thereafter the history of Carchemish is unknown for a considerable time.

References

18th-century BC rulers
Kings of Carchemish